Battaille Harrison Wade (September 14, 1856 - August 11, 1926) was a Democratic member of the Mississippi State Senate, representing the state's 10th senatorial district, from 1916 to 1920.

Biography 
Battaille Harrison Wade was born on September 14, 1856, in Jefferson County, Mississippi. He was the son of Isaac Ross Wade and Catherine E. Dunbar. Wade attended private and then public schools in Jefferson County. In 1915, he was elected to represent Mississippi's 10th senatorial district as a Democrat in the Mississippi State Senate. He served from 1916 to 1920. He died on August 11, 1926.

References 

1856 births
1926 deaths
Democratic Party Mississippi state senators